Steve Wood (born 23 June 1963) is an English former footballer who played in The Football League for Macclesfield Town.

Career
Wood started his career at Chadderton, followed by short stints at Mossley, Droylsden, Stalybridge Celtic and Ashton United before joining Macclesfield Town at the beginning of the 1993–94 season, making his debut in a 5–1 defeat at Bath. With Macclesfield he won the Conference League Cup in 1994, the FA Trophy in 1996, and the Football Conference in 1995 and 1997. After the club's promotion to the Football League Wood signed his first professional contract. Wood stayed with the club until 2001, after which he returned to Stalybridge Celtic, where he played for one season before retiring.

References

1963 births
Living people
English footballers
Association football midfielders
English Football League players
Chadderton F.C. players
Mossley A.F.C. players
Droylsden F.C. players
Ashton United F.C. players
Macclesfield Town F.C. players
Stalybridge Celtic F.C. players